Reyneke Island (Ostrov Reyneke) is an island in the Sea of Okhotsk, administratively part of Khabarovsk Krai, Russia.

History

Reyneke Island was named after Mikhail Reyneke, Vice Admiral of the Imperial Russian Navy and an early hydrographer of the Russian Hydrographic Service in the region.

American whaleships cruised for bowhead whales off the island in the 1850s and 1860s. They called it Duck Island, because ships went there to shoot "ducks" (though whalemen applied the term loosely to a variety of seabirds). They also went to the island to get wood and water.

References

External links
Geographical coordinates of the points defining the position of the straight baselines for measuring the breadth of the territorial sea, the economic zone and the continental shelf of the USSR off the continental coastline and islands of the Pacific Ocean, the Sea of Japan, the Sea of Okhotsk and the Bering Sea

Islands of the Sea of Okhotsk
Islands of Khabarovsk Krai
Uninhabited islands of Russia